The 2019 Novak Djokovic tennis season officially began on 1 January 2019, in the first round of the Qatar Open, and ended 22 November 2019 after Serbia defeat by Russia in the quarterfinals of the Davis Cup Finals.

Yearly summary

Early hard court season

World Tennis Championship
Novak Djokovic started the season by playing the World Tennis Championship, an exhibition tournament on the last week of 2018. He defeated Karen Khachanov and Kevin Anderson to win the tournament for a fourth time.

Qatar Open
Djokovic's first official tournament was the Qatar Open. He reached the semifinals by defeating Damir Džumhur, Márton Fucsovics and Nikoloz Basilashvili, but lost in three sets to eventual champion Roberto Bautista Agut.

Australian Open

Djokovic entered the Australian Open as the top seed. He defeated qualifier Mitchell Krueger, 2008 finalist Jo-Wilfried Tsonga, 25th seed Denis Shapovalov, 15th seed Daniil Medvedev, 8th seed Kei Nishikori, and 28th seed Lucas Pouille to reach the final, in which he beat 2nd seed Rafael Nadal in straight sets to win his 15th Major and a record 7th Australian Open.

Indian Wells Masters
Djokovic's next tournament was the Indian Wells Masters, where he received a first round bye along with 31 seeded players. He won his first match since Australian Open title against Bjorn Fratangelo, but was defeated in two sets by Philipp Kohlschreiber in the third round.

Miami Open
After his early exit at Indian Wells, Djokovic played at the Miami Open where he had previously won six times. After defeating Bernard Tomic and Federico Delbonis, Djokovic faced Roberto Bautista Agut. Djokovic won the first set and went a break up in second set, before a rain delay that seemingly disrupted his momentum. Djokovic eventually lost the match in three sets. After 41 straight wins, it was the first time Djokovic had lost in Miami after winning the first set. After the match, Djokovic admitted being affected by off-court distractions during the tournament.

Clay Court Season

Monte-Carlo Masters
Djokovic's clay court season commenced at the Monte Carlo Masters, which was played in the third week of April. Djokovic received an opening round bye, and made his clay court debut against Philipp Kohlschreiber in the second round, which he won in three tight sets. He reached the quarterfinals, where he lost to Daniil Medvedev in three sets.

Madrid Open
Djokovic followed his Monte Carlo quarterfinal run with a record-tying 33rd Masters 1000 title at the Madrid Open, defeating Stefanos Tsitsipas in the finals. Djokovic won the tournament without dropping a set, securing his third career title at the event.

Italian Open
At the 2019 Italian Open, Djokovic defeated Denis Shapovalov and Philipp Kohlschreiber in straight sets to progress to the quarterfinals. In his next match, Djokovic had to fend off two match points to prevail over Juan Martin del Potro in three sets. In the semifinals, Djokovic defeated Diego Schwartzman in three sets to progress to the finals, where he faced his rival Rafael Nadal for the first time since the 2019 Australian Open. Their 54th encounter saw Nadal prevailing over Djokovic in three sets, that included a bagel in the first set.

French Open

Djokovic entered the French Open aiming to win a fourth straight grand slam title, and becoming the first man in Open Era to win all four grand slams at least twice. He breezed through the tournament and reached the semifinals without dropping a set, after defeating Alexander Zverev in the quarterfinals. In the semifinals, he narrowly lost to Dominic Thiem in a close five set match which lasted two days due to numerous rain delays, ending his 26-match winning streak in grand slam tournaments.

Grass court season

Wimbledon

At Wimbledon, he won his sixteenth Grand Slam, defending his title to win the tournament for a fifth time by defeating Roger Federer in an epic five set final that lasted four hours and fifty seven minutes, the longest in Wimbledon history. Djokovic saved two championship points in the fifth set en route to winning the title and the match also marked the first time a fifth set tiebreak was played in the men's singles of Wimbledon at 12 games all.

North American hard court season

Cincinnati Masters

Djokovic played his US open warm up in Cincinnati. He got a bye to the second round and then beat American Sam Querrey, Spain's Pablo Carreno Busta and France's Lucas Pouille, all in straight sets. In the semifinals however, he was defeated by Russia's Daniil Medvedev in 3 sets after Djokovic was up a set. Medvedev went on to win the title.

US Open

At the US Open, Djokovic was unable to defend his title, falling to Stan Wawrinka in the fourth round, while down two sets and a break before retiring due to injury.  The defeat prevented Djokovic from sweeping three of the four Grand Slams that year, a feat that he achieved in 2011 and 2015.

Fall hard court season

Japan Open
Novak Djokovic won his first Japan Open title and the 76th of his career with a  6–3 6–2 win over Australian John Millman in the final in Tokyo on Oct 06. 2019.  It was a triumphant return  for Djokovic after his shoulder injury causing him to withdraw  from the U.S. Open in the fourth round.

Shanghai Masters

Djokovic entered Shanghai Masters as top seed and defending champion but could not defend his title. He defeated Denis Shapovalov in second round and John Isner in third round in straight sets to enter quarter-finals. He lost in quarter-finals to Stefanos Tsitsipas in three sets 6–3, 5–7, 3–6.

European indoor hard court season

Paris Masters

Djokovic started his campaign with a tough victory over Frenchman Corentin Moutet. From then on, he beat Brit Kyle Edmund, Stefanos Tsitsipas (for the loss of only three games), Grigor Dimitrov and Denis Shapovalov in the final. He did not lose a set in the tournament and clinched a record-extending fifth title in Paris-Bercy.

ATP Finals

Djokovic was placed in the Bjorn Borg group, along with Roger Federer, Dominic Thiem and Matteo Berrettini. He started off with a convincing straight sets win over Berrettini, but lost narrowly to Thiem in a third set tiebreak and to Federer in straight sets, losing the opportunity to finish as the year-end number 1.

Davis Cup Finals

Djokovic helped Serbia to win their group with victories over Yoshihito Nishioka and Benoit Paire, as the country went 5–1 in their matches. In the quarterfinals against Russia, Djokovic won the second rubber against Karen Khachanov but could not avoid the defeat, as he and Viktor Troicki lost a pivotal doubles match to the Russian pair of Khachanov and Rublev.

All matches
This table lists all the matches of Djokovic this year, including walkovers (W/O)

Singles matches

Doubles matches

Exhibition matches

Singles

Doubles

Schedule
Per Novak Djokovic, this is his current 2019 schedule (subject to change).

Singles schedule

Doubles schedule

Yearly records

Head-to-head matchups
Novak Djokovic has a  ATP match win–loss record in the 2019 season. Bold indicates player was ranked top 10 at the time of at least one meeting. The following list is ordered by number of wins:

  Denis Shapovalov 4–0
  Lucas Pouille 3–0
  Philipp Kohlschreiber 3–1
  Taylor Fritz 2–0
  David Goffin 2–0
  Hubert Hurkacz 2–0
  Denis Kudla 2–0
  Stefanos Tsitsipas 2–1
  Nikoloz Basilashvili 1–0
  Salvatore Caruso 1–0
  Roberto Carballés Baena 1–0
  Matteo Berrettini 1–0
  Pablo Carreño Busta 1–0
  Jérémy Chardy 1–0
  Juan Martín del Potro 1–0
  Federico Delbonis 1–0
  Grigor Dimitrov 1–0
  Damir Džumhur 1–0
  Kyle Edmund 1–0
  Bjorn Fratangelo 1–0
  Márton Fucsovics 1–0
  Ugo Humbert 1–0
  John Isner 1–0
  Karen Khachanov 1–0
  Mitchell Krueger 1–0
  Henri Laaksonen 1–0 
  Juan Ignacio Londero 1–0
  John Millman 1–0
  Corentin Moutet 1–0
  Yoshihito Nishioka 1–0
  Kei Nishikori 1–0
  Benoît Paire 1–0
  Alexei Popyrin 1–0
  Sam Querrey 1–0
  Diego Schwartzman 1–0
  Go Soeda 1–0
  Jan-Lennard Struff 1–0
  Bernard Tomic 1–0
  Jo-Wilfried Tsonga 1–0
  Alexander Zverev 1–0
  Roger Federer 1–1
  Rafael Nadal 1–1
  Roberto Bautista Agut 1–2
  Daniil Medvedev 1–2
  Dominic Thiem 1–2
  Stan Wawrinka 0–1

* Statistics correct .

Finals

Singles: 6 (5 titles, 1 runner-up)

Earnings
Bold font denotes tournament win

 Figures in United States dollars (USD) unless noted. 
source：2019 Singles Activity
source：2019 Doubles Activity

Awards and nominations
 Laureus World Sports Award for Sportsman of the Year

See also
 2019 ATP Tour
 2019 Roger Federer tennis season
 2019 Rafael Nadal tennis season

References

External links
  
 ATP tour profile

Novak Djokovic tennis seasons
Djokovic
2019 in Serbian sport